Herpestomus is a genus of parasitoid wasps belonging to the family Ichneumonidae.

The species of this genus are found in Europe.

Species:
 Herpestomus albomaculatus Strobl, 1901 
 Herpestomus arridens (Gravenhorst, 1829)

References

Ichneumonidae
Ichneumonidae genera